John Dastin   (c.1293-c.1386) was an English alchemist of the fourteenth century. Little is known of his life beyond the texts which are attributed to him (A biographical notice De vita, aetate ac scripsis Johannis Dastin is found in a 17th-century manuscript: Ms Oxford, Bold. Libr., Ashmol. 1445, VIII, fol. 53). Dastin is known for correspondence with Pope John XXII and Cardinal Napoleone Orsini in defense of alchemical practice, dated to 1320.

Work attributed to Dastin was included in the 1625 Harmoniae imperscrutabilis Chymico-Philosophicae of Hermannus Condeesyanus, the 1629 Fasciculus Chemicus of Arthur Dee, and the 1652 Theatrum Chemicum Britannicum of Elias Ashmole.

Recent research has revealed that John Dastin lived around 1293-1386. He was born in the village of Greet, in the county of Gloucestershire and was ordained deacon in 1311. He studied at Oxford and was appointed vicar of the church of Bringhurst, Leicestershire. In mid-1317 he traveled to Avignon to work in the service of Cardinal Napoleon Orsini (†1342) and obtained the benefits of a canonry of the collegiate church of Southwell. During his stay in Avignon he was known as "magister Johannes Anglicus." He worked at the court of Napoleon Orsini, and he helped Giovanni Gaetano Orsini during his legacy in Italy (1326-1334). Dastin returned to Oxford in 1341 and was appointed vicar of the Church of Aberford, in Yorkshire, associated with Oriel College. He died at an earlier date than 1386.

Works

Letter to John XXII 
Dastin argues that artificial transmutation into gold with the help of sulphur of mercury (argent vive) is equivalent to natural transformation. Furthermore, that "art imitates nature, and in certain respects corrects and surpasses it just as infirm nature is changed by the industry of medicine."

Rosarius 

The Rosarius Philosophorum, also known by its incipit Desiderabile desiderium (the desired desire). The Rosarium is known in manuscript and was printed in 1702 by Jean-Jacques Manget in his Bibliotheca Chemica Curiosa.

It was also attributed to Dastin's contemporary Arnaldus de Villa Nova (1238-1311 or 1313) and translated into French under the title La Vraie Pratique de la noble science d'alchimie.  Later still it was attributed to Nicolas Flamel under the title The Book of Washing.

Visio 
In manuscripts, this text was often associated with the Visio Edwardi.  It was printed for the first time in 1625 under the title Visio Ioannis Dastin, and translated into English in 1652 in the Theatrum Chemicum Britannicum of Elias Ashmole as Dastin's Dreame.

Notes

Manuscripts 
 Tractatus Joannis Dastin. Cum gauderent uti breuitate Cambridge, Trinity College MS. O.8.36.
 Inc. Ep. Johannis Dastine ad papam Johannem xxii transmissa de alkimia and Visio Joh. Dastin Cambridge, Trinity College MS. O.2.18.  14th and 15th centuries.
 Tractatus Alchemici. De erroribus J. Dastin - British Library MS. Egerton 845. 15th century.

References
Entry in Concise Dictionary of National Biography
 Lynn Thorndike A history of magic and experimental science 1934, vol. 3, pp. 85–102
 C.H. Josten The text of John Dastin's 'Letter to Pope John XXII Ambix, 4:1 & 2 (1949), 34-51
 Wilfred Theisen John Dastin's Letter on the Philosophers' StoneAmbix 1986, vol. 33, no2-3, pp. 78–87 
 Wilfred Theisen John Dastin : the Alchemist as Co-Creator Ambix 1991, vol. 38, no2, pp. 73–78

 John Dastin's Alchemical Dream Kessinger Publishing, 2005
 Pascale Barthélemy et Didier Kahn Les voyages d'une allégorie alchimique : de la Visio Edwardi à l'Oeuvre royalle de Charles VI in Comprendre et maîtriser la nature au Moyen Age. Mélanges d'histoire des sciences offerts à Guy Beaujouan, Genève-Paris / 1994

External links
John Dastin's Dream: online text

14th-century births
English alchemists
Year of death unknown
14th-century alchemists